Fahrzeugtechnik Dessau (FTD) was a manufacturer of rolling stock, based in the German city of Dessau. The activities have been continued by Molinari Rail Systems since November 2016 until 2023.

In the Netherlands, Connexxion operates Protos trains built by this company on the Valleilijn.

Since May 2006, Fahrzeugtechnik Dessau had been part of the Russian conglomerate ZAO Transmashholding. After going bankrupt in March 2008, the company was able to restructure. Since December 2008, Fahrzeugtechnik Dessau had been owned by the Romanian Compania de Transport Feroviar Bucuresti S.A. (CTF). The production of Protos trains was not included in this takeover, which meant that Connexxion in the Netherlands would remain the only customer of these trains.

In March 2016, bankruptcy was filed again. No new investor was found initially and the company was closed down in summer 2016. However, Molinari Rail Systems, a subsidiary of Swiss Molinari Rail, acquired the assets later in the same year and reopened the factory in November 2016. By early 2019, the company employed a staff of 75 in Dessau, with a sales revenue of about five million Euros in 2018.

In November 2022, Molinari Rail Systems had to file for insolvency. A handover to interested successors failed, forcing Molinari Rail to announce the closure of the company. Most of the staff was dismissed in March 2023, with a skeleton crew remaining for a few months for clean-up tasks.

Production 
 The product range included car bodies, propulsion systems, as well as door modules for rail vehicles. Fahrzeugtechnik Dessau developed, designed, and manufactured prototypes and small series of passenger cars, vehicle heads, open and closed freight cars, bogies, and special vehicles, including their testing and commissioning. Further services provided were maintenance, repair, conversion and modernization work, revisions and welding services for railways.

Well-known products include the business express train Metropolitan (MET) as well as the prototype of the "Light Innovative Regional Express (LIREX)" for Alstom LHB in 2000. Another product of Fahrzeugtechnik Dessau is the PROTOS, an electric or diesel-electric driven low-floor regional train with a maximum speed of 160 km/h.

References

External links

 Fahrzeugtechnik Dessau
 
Defunct manufacturing companies of Germany 
Rolling stock manufacturers 
Economy of Saxony-Anhalt 
Dessau-Roßlau